Trollgarden is a glacial moraine in the municipality of Hjelmeland in Rogaland county, Norway. The name "Trollgarden" is translated to English as The Troll's stone fence since it looks like a rock wall that a troll may have built around its farm.

Access
In the old days, people thought it was magic powers such as trolls that had built the massive stone fence far into the Hjelmeland moors. The geological explanation is that, when the glacial ice retreated, the stones were deposited in the mountains. To see Trollgarden, one must hike for about two hours to reach the moraine.

Geology
The geology of the Trollgarden area was thoroughly investigated and described by Professor Bjørn G. Andersen in his Master's thesis (1954)  (On the glacial retreat in the area between the Lysefjorden and Jøsenfjorden in Ryfylke).

See also

List of mountains of Norway
Terminal moraine
List of glacial moraines

References

External links
 Geoprofiler: En bauta i norsk geologi by Jan Mangerud at Geoforskning.no 
 Trollgarden - Steingard med dimensjoner
 Trolsk møte med Trollgarden
 Map of Trollgarden 2008

Landforms of Rogaland
Moraines of Europe
Glacial deposits of Norway
Hjelmeland